The list below shows the all-time record of HC Slovan Bratislava in KHL against all opponents since they joined the league in 2012.

Regular season record
This list includes regular season matches only.

Record against teams not participating in the league in current season

Notes
 The division alignments are according to the most recent season.
 Due to frequent changes in KHL teams, Slovan did not play the same number of games against all teams.
 Owing to changes in playing formats, it is not necessary for Slovan to play the same number of home games and away games with some teams.

Overall regular season record

Play-off record

Overall play-off record

Nadezhda Cup record

See also
2012–13 HC Slovan Bratislava season
2013–14 HC Slovan Bratislava season
2014–15 HC Slovan Bratislava season
2015–16 HC Slovan Bratislava season
2016–17 HC Slovan Bratislava season

References
 Official KHL website

Notes

HC Slovan Bratislava